Lake Forest may refer to:

In communities:
Lake Forest, California, in Orange County
Lake Forest, Placer County, California
Lake Forest, Florida
Lake Forest, Illinois
Lake Forest, Texas
Lake Forest, a neighborhood of Louisville, Kentucky
Lake Forest, a neighborhood of Bridgeport, Connecticut
Lake Forest Park, Washington

In education:
Lake Forest Academy (Lake Forest, Illinois)
Lake Forest College (Lake Forest, Illinois)
Lake Forest Elementary School, a school of the arts in Jacksonville, Florida

In transportation:
Lake Forest (Metra Milwaukee District/North station), a railroad station on the west side of Lake Forest, Illinois
Lake Forest (Metra Union Pacific/North station) a railroad station on the east side of Lake Forest, Illinois

See also
Forest Lake (disambiguation)